Josef Rodzinski (29 August 1907 – 1 December 1984) was a German footballer who played as a midfielder and made three appearances for the Germany national team.

Career
Rodzinski made his international debut for Germany on 13 September 1936 in a friendly match against Poland, which finished as a 1–1 draw in Warsaw. He earned three caps in total for Germany, making his final appearance on 17 October 1936 in a friendly against the Irish Free State, which finished as a 2–5 loss in Dublin.

Personal life
Rodzinski died on 1 December 1984 at the age of 77.

Career statistics

International

References

External links
 
 
 
 

1907 births
1984 deaths
Footballers from Duisburg
German footballers
Germany international footballers
Association football midfielders
Hamborn 07 players